Mount Faget is a mountain,  high,  northwest of Mount Adam in the Admiralty Mountains of Victoria Land, Antarctica. This topographical feature was first mapped by the United States Geological Survey from surveys and U.S. Navy air photos, 1960–63, and was named by the Advisory Committee on Antarctic Names for Maxime A. Faget of the National Aeronautics and Space Administration, a visitor at McMurdo Station, Hut Point Peninsula, Ross Island, 1966–67. It has frequently been noted on lists of unusual place names. The mountain lies situated on the Pennell Coast, a portion of Antarctica lying between Cape Williams and Cape Adare.

References 

Mountains of Victoria Land
Pennell Coast